Austrotrochaclis is a genus of sea snails, marine gastropod mollusks in the family Ataphridae, the false top snails.

Species
Species within the genus Austrotrochaclis include:
 Austrotrochaclis ponderi Marshall, 1995

References

External links
 To World Register of Marine Species

Ataphridae
Monotypic gastropod genera